Paul Lawrence "Tank" Younger (June 25, 1928 – September 15, 2001) was an American professional football player who was a fullback, halfback, and linebacker in the National Football League (NFL) from 1949 through 1958. He played college football for Grambling State University, was the first NFL player from a predominantly black college, and was the first African American to become an NFL front-office administrator (scout and executive with the Rams until 1975).

College career
At Grambling, Younger started off as a tackle, but coach Eddie Robinson soon recognized that Younger's skills better suited him to play in the offensive backfield and at linebacker. Younger earned the nickname "Tank" by deftly plowing over countless would-be tacklers. In 1945, as a freshman, Younger led the nation in scoring with 25 touchdowns. In his junior year, he rushed for 1,207 yards and scored 18 touchdowns. Younger also completed 43 of 73 pass attempts, 11 for touchdowns. When he graduated in 1948, his NCAA career total of 60 touchdowns (scored mostly on punt returns and end-around plays) was an all-time record. After his senior season, he was voted Black College Football's Player of the Year and named a member of the 1948 Pittsburgh Courier All-America team.

Professional career
Undrafted by an NFL team, Younger signed with the Los Angeles Rams as a free agent and became the first NFL player from an HBCU.  He was a member of the Rams renowned "Bull Elephant" backfield (with "Deacon" Dan Towler and Dick Hoerner), and he is the sixth-leading rusher in Rams history with 3,296 yards.

In his ten-year professional career with the Rams and the Pittsburgh Steelers, Younger was named to the Pro Bowl four times (1951, 1952, 1953, and 1955), rushed for 3640 yards on 770 carries, caught 100 passes for 1167 yards, scored 35 touchdowns (34 rushing, 1 receiving), and intercepted three passes on defense (also throwing an interception on his only NFL pass attempt). He was the first black player to play in an NFL All-Star Game and became the league's first black assistant general manager (with the San Diego Chargers, 1975–1987). In 2000, Younger was inducted into the College Football Hall of Fame. The Professional Football Researchers Association named Younger to the PRFA Hall of Very Good Class of 2007

References

External links
 
 
 

1928 births
2001 deaths
American football fullbacks
American football halfbacks
American football linebackers
Grambling State Tigers football players
Los Angeles Rams scouts
Los Angeles Rams executives
Los Angeles Rams players
Pittsburgh Steelers players
San Diego Chargers executives
College Football Hall of Fame inductees
Western Conference Pro Bowl players
Sportspeople from Grambling, Louisiana
Players of American football from Louisiana
African-American players of American football
African-American sports executives and administrators
Burials at Inglewood Park Cemetery
20th-century African-American sportspeople